The County of Zweibrücken-Bitsch was a territory of the Holy Roman Empire that was created between 1286 and 1302 from the eastern part of the County of Zweibrücken and the Barony of Bitche in Lorraine. It continued to exist until 1570 and was then divided amongst its heirs when the counts died out.

History 
When the land of Zweibrücken was divided amongst the sons of Count Henry II of Zweibrücken, the district (Amt) of Lemberg and Lemberg Castle went to the elder son, Eberhard I from 1286. His portion also included Morsberg, Linder and Saargemünd. In 1297 he swapped these three castles with Duke Frederick III of Lorraine and received in return the castle and lordship of Bitsch as a fief. This exchange of territory was further defined in 1302. From then on, Eberhard called himself the Count of Zweibrücken and Lord of Bitsch. Because he and his descendants bore the comital title, the new territory was called the County of Zweibrücken-Bitsch.

Other lands were initially managed jointly by Eberhard I and his younger brother, Walram I, who had been given the Amt of Zweibrücken. These were not finally apportioned until 1333. Walram inherited Stauf Castle, Bergzabern and the town and abbey of Hornbach. Eberhard received Thaleischweiler, Pirmasens and part-ownership of the castles of Landeck and Lindelbronn. In the period that followed the counts of Bitsch succeeded in acquiring a few other properties, but only in the immediate vicinity. When their Zweibrücken cousins died out in 1394, they did receive parts of the inheritance, but not the County of Zweibrücken because the last count had sold his county in 1385 to Electoral Palatinate.

In the 16th century, Count James succeeded for the last time in establishing a clear concentration of power in northern Alsace and southern Palatinate: in 1559 he obtained the Barony of Ochsenstein because the side line of Zweibrücken-Bitsch-Ochsenstein, that had existed since 1485, had died out. Because, however, James as well as his brother Simon V Wecker (died 1540) had each only produced a daughter, a dispute broke out in 1570 after James' death between the husbands of the two cousins, Count Philip I of Leiningen-Westerburg and Count Philip V of Hanau-Lichtenberg. Whilst Philip V of Hanau-Lichtenberg was able to overpower Philip I, his immediate introduction of Lutheranism in the course of the Reformation made himself an enemy of the powerful, Roman Catholic Duchy of Lorraine under Duke Charles III, who had the suzerainty of Bitsch. In July 1572 troops of Lorraine occupied the county. Because Philip V could not match Lorraine's military might, he sought legal redress.

During the subsequent trial before the Reichskammergericht, Lorraine was able to point both to the exchange agreement of 1302 as well as the fact that, in 1573, it had purchased the hereditary rights of the counts of Leiningen.

In 1604 there was a contractual agreement between Hanau-Lichtenberg and Lorraine. This saw the Amt of Lemberg going to the County of Hanau-Lichtenberg and the Amt of Bitsch to the Duchy of Lorraine.

List of the counts of Zweibrücken-Bitsch 
 13 May 1297 – 1321: Eberhard I
his grandparents were Count Henry I and his wife, Hedwig of Lorraine, a daughter of Frederick of Bitsch.
 1321–1355: Simon I m Agnes of Lichtenberg
 1355–1400: John (Hanemann) I 
 1400–1418: John (Hanemann) II
initially ruled jointly with his brother, Simon III Wecker (d 1407)
 1418–1474: Frederick
his brother, Henry I, married Cunigunde of Ochsenstein and founded the side line of Zweibrücken-Bitsch-Ochsenstein
 1474–1499: Simon IV Wecker m Elisabeth of Lichtenberg: b 1444, d 1495, daughter-heir
 1499–1532: Reinhard, Lord of Lichtenberg and Bitsch, Count of Zweibrücken m Anna of Dhaun, daughter of John VI, Wild-Rhine Count of Dhaun and Kirburg (b 1470; d 25 December 1499) and Joanna of Salm; they had four children:
 William (b 8 December 1507)
 Elizabeth m John Louis I of Sulz
 James (b 19 July 1510) m Catharine of Honstein-Klettenberg
 Joanna (b 10 June 1517) m Conrad V of Tübingen-Lichteneck
 1532–1540: Simon V Wecker
only had a daughter, Amalia (b 1537; d 1577, m 1551 Philip I of Leiningen-Westerburg); as a result followed by his brother
 1540–1570: James (b 19 July 1510, d  24 March 1570 in Stürzelbronn) 
also had only a daughter, Ludovica Margareta of Zweibrücken-Bitsch (b 1540; d 1569), m Count Philip V of Hanau-Lichtenberg

Coat of arms 
Blazon: Or, a lion rampant gules, armed and langued azure.

References

Literature 
 Hans-Walter Herrmann: Die Grafschaft Zweibrücken-Bitsch. In: Kurt Hoppstädter, Hans-Walter Herrmann (ed.): Geschichtliche Landeskunde des Saarlandes. Vol. 2: Von der fränkischen Landnahme bis zum Ausbruch der französischen Revolution. Saarbrücken, 1977, pp. 323–332. 
 Johann Georg Lehmann: Urkundliche Geschichte der Grafschaft Hanau-Lichtenberg. Mannheim, 1862.
 Detlev Schwennicke: Europäische Stammtafeln, Vol. XVII – Zwischen Maas und Rhein. Frankfurt, 1998, pp. 148–149.

Lists of counts
Counties of the Holy Roman Empire
History of Lorraine
Electoral Palatinate
Western Palatinate
Former states and territories of Rhineland-Palatinate
1570 disestablishments in the Holy Roman Empire